The 2000 season was the 32nd in the history of the Kansas City Royals, and their 28th at Kauffman Stadium. They had a record of 77 wins and 85 losses, finishing 4th in the American League Central.

Offseason 
 November 16, 1999: Izzy Molina was signed as a free agent by the Royals.
 December 10, 1999: Doug Bochtler was signed as a free agent with the Kansas City Royals.
 December 17, 1999: Scott Service was released by the Royals.
 January 27, 2000: Ricky Bottalico was signed as a free agent by the Royals.
 March 7, 2000: Gregg Zaun was sent to the Royals by the Detroit Tigers as part of a conditional deal.

Regular season 
June 28, 2000: Pitcher Jay Witasick threw exactly three pitches and recorded three outs. This was accomplished in the second inning.

Opening Day Roster 
 Carlos Beltrán
 Johnny Damon
 Jermaine Dye
 Carlos Febles
 Brian Johnson
 Mark Quinn
 Joe Randa
 Rey Sánchez
 Mac Suzuki
 Mike Sweeney

Season standings

Record vs. opponents

Roster

Player stats

Batting

Starters by position 
Note: Pos = Position; G = Games played; AB = At bats; H = Hits; HR = Home runs; RBI = Runs batted in; Avg. = Batting average;

Other batters 
Note: G = Games played; AB = At bats; H = Hits; HR = Home runs; RBI = Runs batted in; Avg. = Batting average

Pitching

Starting pitchers 
Note: G = Games pitched; IP = Innings pitched; W = Wins; L = Losses; ERA = Earned run average; SO = Strikeouts

Other pitchers 
Note: G = Games pitched; IP = Innings pitched; W = Wins; L = Losses; ERA = Earned run average; SO = Strikeouts

Relief pitchers 
Note: G = Games pitched; W = Wins; L = Losses; SV = Saves; ERA = Earned run average; SO = Strikeouts

Farm system

Notes

References 
 2000 Kansas City Royals team at Baseball-Reference
 2000 Kansas City Royals team at baseball-almanac.com

Kansas City Royals seasons
Kansas City Royals season
Kansas